The Martens Clause (pronounced ) was introduced into the preamble to the 1899 Hague Convention II – Laws and Customs of War on Land.

The clause took its name from a declaration read by Friedrich Martens, the delegate of Russia at the Hague Peace Conferences of 1899.  It reads as follows:

The Clause appears in a slightly modified form in the 1907 Hague conventions:

The Clause was introduced as a compromise wording for the dispute between the Great Powers who considered francs-tireurs to be unlawful combatants subject to execution on capture and smaller states who maintained that they should be considered lawful combatants.

The clause did not appear in the Geneva Conventions of 1949, but was it included in the additional protocols of 1977. It is in  article 1 paragraph 2 of Protocol I (which covers international conflicts), and the fourth paragraph of the preamble to Protocol II (which covers non-international conflicts). The wording in both is identical but slightly modified from the version used in the Hague Convention of 1907:

In its commentary (Geneva 1987), the ICRC states that although the Martens Clause is considered to be part of customary international law, the plenipotentiaries considered its inclusion appropriate because:

Rupert Ticehurst, a Lecturer in Law, at King's College School of Law in London, writes that:

The International Court of Justice (ICJ) in their advisory opinion on the Legality of the Threat or Use of Nuclear Weapons issued on 8 July 1996, had to consider the general laws of armed conflict before they could consider the specific laws relating to nuclear weapons. Several different interpretations of this clause were presented in oral and written submissions to the ICJ. Although the ICJ advisory opinion did not provide a clear understanding of the Clause, several of submissions to the court provided an insight into its meaning.

The evidence that Ticehurst presents is that just as in 1899 there was a disagreement between the great powers and the minor powers that lead to the formulation of the Clause, so in 1996 a similar divergence of views exists between the declared nuclear powers and the non nuclear powers with the nuclear powers taking a narrow view of the Clause and the non nuclear powers taking a more expansive view.

Ticehurst concludes that:

Judicial review
Several national and international courts have considered the Martens Clause when making their judgements. In none of these cases however have the laws of humanity or the dictates of the public conscience been recognised as new and independent right. The clause served rather as general statement for humanitarian principles as well as guideline to the understanding and interpretation of existing rules of international law.

The Martens Clause was quoted in the following judicial rulings:

 Decision of the Supreme Court of Norway on 27 February 1946 in appeal proceedings against Karl-Hans Hermann Klinge, Kriminalassistent of the Gestapo (confirmation of the death sentence imposed by the first instance)
 Decision of the US military tribunal III in Nuremberg on 10 February 1948 in the case United States v. Krupp
 Decision of the Netherlands court of cassation on 12 January 1949 in the procedure against SS-Obergruppenführer Hanns Rauter, general commissioner for the safety organization in the Netherlands from 1940 to 1945
 Decision Brussels military courts (Conseil de guerre de Bruxelles) in the K.W.. case on 8 February 1950
 Decision of the International Criminal Tribunal for the Former Yugoslavia on 8 March 1996 over the permission of the accusation during the process against Milan Martić (case IT-95-11, decision IT-95-11-R61)
 Decision of the Constitutional Court of Colombia of 18 May 1995 for the constitutionality of Protocol II Additional to the Geneva Conventions of 12 August 1949, and Relating to the Protection of Victims of Non-International Armed Conflicts. (decision C-225/95)
 The International Court of Justice advisory opinion on the Legality of the Threat or Use of Nuclear Weapons issued on 8 July 1996
 Judgement of the German Federal Constitutional Court on 26 October 2004 for the compatibility of the expropriations in the former Soviet zone of occupation between 1945 and 1949 with international law (decision BVerfG, 2 BvR 955/00 of 26.10.2004)

References
 Pustogarov, Vladimir Vasilievich. Fyodor Fyodorovich Martens (1845–1909) – a humanist of modern times, 30 June 1996,  International Review of the Red Cross no 312, p. 300–314
 Ticehurst, Rupert. The Martens Clause and the Laws of Armed Conflict 30 April 1997,  International Review of the Red Cross no 317, p. 125–134

Further reading
 . 
 
 Theodor Meron, On Custom and the Antecedents of the Martens Clause in Medieval and Renaissance Ordinances of War, Recht zwischen Umbruch und Bewahrung : Völkerrecht, Europarecht, Staatsrecht : Festschrift für Rudolf Bernhardt p. 173–177 (Ulrich Beyerlin et al., eds., 1995).
 Vladimir V. Pustogarov: The Martens Clause in International Law. In: Journal of the History of International Law. 1(2)/1999, Martinus Nijhoff Publishers, S. 125–135, 
Ivan Shearer. The Future of Humanitarian Intervention: Rules of conduct during humanitarian interventions on the website of  American Diplomacy

Footnotes

Hague Conventions of 1899 and 1907
International humanitarian law treaties
Treaties concluded in 1899
Treaties entered into force in 1910